The Canton of Fougères-Sud is a former canton of France, in the Ille-et-Vilaine département. It had 19,008 inhabitants (2012). It was disbanded following the French canton reorganisation which came into effect in March 2015.

The canton comprised the following communes:

 Billé
 Combourtillé 
 Dompierre-du-Chemin 
 Fougères (fraction) 
 Javené 
 Lécousse 
 Parcé
 Romagné
 Saint-Sauveur-des-Landes

References

Former cantons of Ille-et-Vilaine
2015 disestablishments in France
States and territories disestablished in 2015